Hallasan  National Park is located in the province of Jeju-do, South Korea. It was designated as the 9th national park in 1970. It features the highest mountain in South Korea, the shield volcano Hallasan on Jeju Island. It was designated a UNESCO Biosphere Reserve in 2002, and a World Heritage Site in 2007.

Hallasan National Park is managed by Jeju Special Self-Governing Province. It is the only out of 22 national parks that is not managed by the Korea National Park Service.

Trails
Hallasan has 7 trails: Eorimok Trail (6.8 km), Yeongsil Trail (5.8 km), Seongpanak Trail (9.6 km), Seokgulam Trail (1.5 km), Gwaneumsa Trail (8.7 km), Donnaeko Trail (7 km), and Eoseungsaengak Trail (1.3 km). The longest trail is Seongpanak Trail which takes about 4.5 hours.
 Eorimok Trail() (6.8 km): Eorimok Trail Starts from Hallasan National Park’s Visitors center (altitude 970 m) and finishes at the South cliff junction (altitude 1.600 m). It takes about 3 hours for a one way trip.
 Yeongsil Trail (5.8 km): Yeongsill Trail starts from Yeongsil Management Office (altitude 1.000 m) to South cliff junction. It takes about 3 hours 15 minutes for a one way trip.
 Seongpanak Trail (9.6 km): Seongpanak Trail starts from visitor center to Hallasan Baengnokdam Lake Summit. It takes about 4.5 hours for a one way trip.
 Seokgulam Trail (1.5 km)
 Gwaneumsa Trail (8.7 km): Gwaneumsa Trail starts from Gwaneumsa Campground to Hallasan Baengnokdam Lake Summit. It takes 5 hours for a one way trip.
 Donnaeko Trail (7 km): Donnaeko Trail starts from the Visitor Center(altitude 500m) to the South Cliff Junction. It takes 3.5 hours for a one way trip.
 Eoseungsaengak Trail (1.3 km): Eoseungsaengak Trail starts from Hallasan National Park Visitor Center to Eoseungsaeng-oreum Summit. It takes 30 minutes for a one way trip.

Topography
Hallasan comprises 153.112 km2 of Jeju Island. It rises 1.950 m above sea level, which means that it is the highest mountain in South Korea. This mountain was formed in the fourth Cenozoic era by the eruption of a volcano. It is mostly composed of basalts. It extends east and west, and it has high and gradual ascent. On the other hand, the south part of the mountain is steep. In the summit, there is a crater lake called “Baekrokdam.”

Since the mountain has high altitude, there are a number of alpine plants and animals. 1800 kinds of plants, including 400 kinds of specimen plants and 50 kinds of special plants, exist in Hallasan. Jeju island was designated as a Biosphere Reserve in 2002 and Hallasan National Park is one of the regions of Jeju Bioshere.

References

External links

 

National parks of South Korea
Protected areas established in 1970
Parks in Jeju Province
Biosphere reserves of South Korea